The Kular Range (Khrebet Kular; , Kular Sis) is a range of mountains in far North-eastern Russia. Administratively the range is part of the Eveno-Bytantaysky National District of the Sakha Republic, Russian Federation.

This range is one of the places in Yakutia where yedoma are found.

Geography
In the northeast rise the Kyundyulyun mountains, a prolongation beyond the Yana River and to the southeast the Yana Plateau.

It is one of the main subranges of the Verkhoyansk Range system. To the west it is limited by the Omoloy River valley, beyond which rises the Sietinden Range, which runs in a parallel direction. The range is deeply cut by wide riverine intermontane basins in its middle part. Rivers Baky and Ulakhan-Kyuegyulyur have their source in the range. The Yana-Indigirka Lowland lies to the northeast.

Ulakhan Sis Range

The Yana River meanders northwards east of the Ulakhan Sis Range and beyond it rises the Magyl-Tasa Massif.

Khayrdakh Ridge 
The Khayrdakh Ridge is a smaller subrange of the Kular Range located between the lower course of the Bytantay and the Baky.

Flora
The mountains are covered with mountain tundra and in the valleys with larch forests and tundra.

References

Mountain ranges of Russia
Verkhoyansk Range